Sympathique is the first full-length album from the Portland, Oregon band Pink Martini. It was released on November 11, 1997 by Pink Martini's own record label, Heinz Records. As of 2013 it has sold over one million copies worldwide.

Track listing

Lyrics
The first and second lines of the first verse and the first line of the chorus (″Je ne veux pas travailler″) of the song Sympathique are taken from Guillaume Apollinaire's poem ″Hôtel″ from Le guetteur mélancolique. The French composer Francis Poulenc used that poem as part of the lyrics for his 1940 composition Banalités, FP 107.

Personnel

 China Forbes, vocals
 Pepe Raphael, vocals
 Gavin Bondy, trumpet
 Robert Taylor, trombone
 Aaron Meyer, violin
 David Eby, cello
 John Wager, bass
 Dan Faehnle, guitar
 Maureen Love, harp
 Doug Smith, vibes and percussion
 Richard Rothfus, bongos, drums, and percussion
 Brian Davis, congas, timbales & percussion
 Derek Rieth, congas & percussion
 Thomas Lauderdale, piano

Certifications

References

External links
 Sympathique! – official album page, with audio samples

1997 debut albums
Pink Martini albums
Heinz Records albums